Arthur Bayldon (20 March 186526 September 1958 ) was an English-born Australian poet.

Bayldon was born in 1865, at Leeds, England, and was educated at Leeds Grammar School.  He emigrated to Australia in 1889 prior to which he had travelled extensively in Europe.  He was an excellent swimmer, and drew much attention to a stroke of his own invention — underwater on his back, with legs and arms bound.
  
He was literary critic for The Bulletin, and as a bush poet has been ranked with Henry Lawson, Banjo Patterson, Will Ogilvie, E. J. Brady, and Rod Quinn.

He died in 1958, aged 93.

Bibliography

Poetry collections
 Lays and Lyrics (1887)
 Poems (1897)
 The Western Track and Other Verses (1905)
 The Eagles : Collected Poems of Arthur Bayldon (1921)
 Apollo in Australia; and Bush Verses (1944)

Short story collection
 The Tragedy Behind the Curtain and Other Stories (1910)

References

English emigrants to Australia
Australian poets
1865 births
1958 deaths
Australian literary critics
People from Leeds